Ryan Sullivan is a speedway rider.

Ryan Sullivan may refer to:

Ryan Sullivan (cyclist) (born 1984), Australian racing cyclist
Ryan Sullivan (golfer) (born 1989), American golfer
Ryan Sullivan (artist) (born 1983), American abstract painter

See also
Brian Sullivan (disambiguation)